This is a list of University of Texas at El Paso Miners in the NFL Draft.

Key

Selections

References

UTEP

UTEP Miners NFL Draft